Blood Moon is the sixth extended play by South Korean boy band Oneus. It was released by RBW and distributed by Kakao Entertainment on November 9, 2021. The EP contains seven tracks, including the lead single, "Luna".

Background and release 
Prior to the release of the EP, Oneus held an online and offline concert, "Oneus Theatre: Blood Moon", in Seoul from November 6 to 7.  

On November 9, the group released their sixth EP Blood Moon, with the lead single "Luna".

Critical reception
Billboard described "Luna" as "the celebration of classic and modern-day sounds" by "blending of traditional instrumentation with dreamy synthesizers", and similarly NME described "Luna" as "a homecoming of sorts", balancing between old and new with "gayageum strings warbling over trap beats touched by ’80s synthwave".

On November 17, the group earned their first music show win of their career with "Luna" on MBC M's Show Champion.

Year-end lists

Track listing

Charts

Album

Weekly charts

Monthly charts

Year-end charts

Songs

Weekly charts

Release history

Certification and sales

References 

2021 EPs
Korean-language EPs
Oneus albums